"Popping Cherry" is the third episode of the first season of the American television drama series Dexter, which first aired on 15 October 2006 on Showtime in the United States. The episode was written by Daniel Cerone and was directed by Michael Cuesta.

Plot

After the discovery of another victim of the Ice Truck Killer at an ice rink, the missing guard, Tony Tucci, becomes a potential suspect. Meanwhile, Rita receives an unpleasant visit from her ex-husband's drug dealer, who confiscates her car, forcing her to take the bus to and from her job as a hotel receptionist. Dexter selects his next murder victim while having flashbacks of his first killing—a nurse (Denise Crosby) who was caring for Dexter's sick father, Harry Morgan, but was administering overdoses of medication too and slowly killing her patients. Elsewhere, Sergeant Doakes continues to harass Guerrero, as a group of renegade police officers decide to take matters involving Guerrero into their own hands.

Production

Filming locations for the episode included Miami, Florida, as well as Long Beach and Los Angeles, California.

Reception

The episode was positively received. IGN's Eric Goldman gave the episode a rating of 8 out of 10, and commented that "Dexter's voiceovers are a fun element of the show and a great insight into how his mind works".

References

External links

 
 "Popping Cherry" at Showtime's website

2006 American television episodes
Dexter (TV series) episodes
Television episodes directed by Michael Cuesta